The Nikon-Walkley Australian Press Photographer of the Year, or Nikon-Walkley Press Photographer of the Year is awarded to the photographer whose body of work is considered the best in the country for that year. It recognises newsworthiness, impact, technical superiority, creativity and originality in news photography.

The annual Nikon-Walkley Photographic Awards are the highest honour for Australian press photographers.
They represent the pinnacle of achievement and are judged by a panel of senior photographers and picture editors across the industry.

It was first awarded in 1969 as a separate award, but in 2000 merged with the Walkley Awards to create the current prize.

Partial list of winners:

See also 
 Walkley Awards

References

Australian journalism awards
Awards established in 1969